This is a discography of Eels and other musical projects of Mark Oliver Everett, such as MC Honky.

Albums

Studio albums

Live albums

Compilations

Extended plays

Singles

Promotional singles
"Climbing to the Moon" (1998)
"3 Speed" (1998)
"Jeannie's Diary" (2000)
"Fresh Feeling" (2001)
"Rotten World Blues" (2000)
"Saturday Morning" (2003)
"Trouble with Dreams" (2005)

Notes:

Video albums
Eels with Strings: Live at Town Hall (2006)
Eels Video Collection (2008) (Part of the Meet the Eels: Essential Eels Vol. I compilation)
Eels Lollapalooza 2006 (2008) (Part of the Useless Trinkets compilation)
Live and in Person! London 2006 (released together with the CD) (2008)

Music videos

Songs in film and television

Songs from compilations

E Works
E Works is the vanity label set up exclusively to release Eels live albums. These self-released albums include Oh, What a Beautiful Morning (2000), Electro-Shock Blues Show (2002), Sixteen Tons (Ten Songs) (2005), and Live and in Person! London 2006 (2008). The band has only sold these albums at live shows and later online. The logo for E Works is a parody of that for DreamWorks' record label, who originally signed Eels.

References

External links

EelsTheDiscography.co.uk – Collectors and fansite.
SwissCharts.com – Chart positions for Switzerland.

Discography
Discographies of American artists
Rock music group discographies
Alternative rock discographies